The 1991–92 Boise State Broncos men's basketball team represented Boise State University during the 1991–92 NCAA Division I men's basketball season. The Broncos were led by ninth-year head coach Bobby Dye and played their home games on campus at the BSU Pavilion in Boise, Idaho.

At the conference tournament in Missoula, Montana, the fifth-seeded Broncos lost to fourth seed Idaho by nineteen points in the quarterfinal round.

Postseason results

|-
!colspan=6 style=| Big Sky tournament

References

External links
Sports Reference – Boise State Broncos – 1991–92 basketball season

Boise State Broncos men's basketball seasons
Boise State
Boise State